Chokher Aloy is a 1989 Bengali film directed by Sachin Adhikari. The music of the film was composed by Bappi Lahiri. The film stars Debashree Roy, Prosenjit Chatterjee and Tapas Paul in the leading roles.

Cast
 Debashree Roy
 Prosenjit Chatterjee
 Tapas Paul
 Subhendu Chatterjee
 Anil Chatterjee

References

External links
 

Bengali-language Indian films
1989 films
1980s Bengali-language films
Films scored by Bappi Lahiri